Northwest Whitfield High School or Northwest High School (NHS) is a public high school located in unincorporated Whitfield County, Georgia, United States. It has a Tunnel Hill postal address and is adjacent to, but not within, the city limits of Varnell. It is a part of the Whitfield County School District. The school colors are royal blue and burnt orange, and the mascot is the Bruin.  The school is in Class AAAA of the Georgia High School Association (GHSA).

History
Northwest Whitfield High School opened in the fall of 1975. It was created by a merger of North Whitfield High School and Westside High School. Southeast Whitfield High School was also opened in fall of 1975 as the Whitfield County School District merged its four high schools into two.

Businessman and later 45th President Donald Trump attended the 1991 homecoming football game.

Academics
Students can take college prep, honors, and Advanced Placement classes.

Feeder schools
Two middle schools feed into Northwest Whitfield High School: New Hope Middle School and Westside Middle School. Before the opening of Coahulla Creek, North Whitfield Middle was also one of Northwest Whitfield's feeder schools. The recently built Coahulla Creek High School's feeder school is now North Whitfield Middle School.

Athletics
Northwest Whitfield fields 20 varsity-level teams (10 men's and 10 women's), and competes in Region 7AAAA.

Northwest Whitfield traditionally has three rivals: Southeast Whitfield High School, Dalton High School, and Murray County High School, and more recently newer Whitfield County school Coahulla Creek High School.

Men's sports: 
Baseball
Basketball
Cross country
Football
Golf
Soccer
Swimming
Tennis
Track and field
Wrestling

Women's sports: 
Basketball
Competition cheerleading
Cross country
Golf
Soccer
Swimming
Tennis
Track and field
Volleyball

State Champions
Soccer: 2018 AAAA State Champions 
Baseball: 1982 AAA State Champions
Softball:
1987 AAA State Champions
1993 AAA State Champions
2012 AAAA State Champions
2013 AAAA State Champions
Track and field:
2006 and 2008 men's pole vault - Nate Woodason
2009 men's pole vault - Jake Bridges
2009 men's 1600 meters - AJ Meyer
2009 women's 400 and 800 meters - Morgan Williams
 Women's golf: 2009 AAAA State Champions
State Runners-up
Women's basketball: 1990 AAA State Runner-Up, 2010 AAAA State Runner-Up
State runs
Men's soccer: 2012 Elite 8 (placed 8th in the state), 2013 Semi-Final (placed 3rd in the state playoffs.)

Fine arts
Fine arts at Northwest consist of choral, band, art, and drama departments.

 The Band Department has the Sound of the Blazing Blue, Wind Ensemble, Jazz Band, and Concert Band, the largest being the Sound of the Blazing Blue with 200 members. The band director is Daniel Vanoy.
 The Choral Department is Ladies of Northwest Ensemble, Northwest Singers, Ladies Trio and Men's Quartet (the last two groups compete as part of the GHSA Literary Meet). The choral director is Mrs. Tommary Ehlers.
 The Drama Department consists of One-Act play, Improv Comedy Team, Fine Arts Ambassador Program serving area feeder schools, Summer Programs, class plays, and a large spring musical.  The director of the Drama Department is Josh Ruben, M. Ed.

Notable alumni
 Bayli Cruse - softball player
 Isaiah Mack - football player
 Marla Maples - actress and television personality
 Steve Prohm - basketball coach

References

External links
Northwest Whitfield High School

Public high schools in Georgia (U.S. state)
Schools in Whitfield County, Georgia
Educational institutions established in 1975
1975 establishments in Georgia (U.S. state)